The World Blitz Chess Championship is a chess tournament held to determine the world champion in chess played under blitz time controls. Since 2012, FIDE has held an annual joint rapid and blitz chess tournament and billed it as the World Rapid & Blitz Chess Championships. The current world blitz champion is the Norwegian Grandmaster Magnus Carlsen. Bibisara Assaubayeva from Kazakhstan is the current women's blitz world champion. Magnus Carlsen has won the event a record six times.

Time controls

Starting in the early 1900s, chess clubs began to organize tournament played at accelerated time controls; these early games usually required a set number of moves from each player within a certain time interval. One of the earliest examples was the local chess club at Hastings, England, where 10 seconds were allowed per-move during a blitz tournament held after the 1904 British Chess Championship. By 1950, the time controls had changed to the more familiar 5 minutes per player (now 3 minutes), hence the "5-minute game" moniker. The term "blitz chess" would not be coined until the 1960s.

FIDE-recognized events

FIDE World Blitz Championship (2006–2010)

The first blitz chess tournament to be recognized by FIDE as a "world championship" took place on 6 September 2006 in Rishon Lezion, Israel. Structured as a 16-player round-robin, the tournament featured seven of the world's top 20 Grandmasters, as well as a young Magnus Carlsen. After 15 rounds, Alexander Grischuk and Peter Svidler finished atop the leaderboard with 10½/15; Grischuk subsequently defeated Svidler with Black in an armageddon game to win the championship. The following year, the tournament (now branded as the FIDE World Blitz Cup) was held in Moscow, Russia following the Tal Memorial tournament and was re-structured as a 20-player double-round robin with a significantly stronger field. After Ukrainian grandmaster Vasyl Ivanchuk and Indian grandmaster Viswanathan Anand entered the final round tied on points, Ivanchuk defeated Anand from a disadvantaged position to win the tournament with 25½/38.

In 2008, the championship reverted to a 16-player round robin. Despite a late charge from the defending champion Ivanchuk, who won seven of the final eight rounds, the tournament was won by Leinier Domínguez, a 25-year-old GM from Cuba who scored 11½/15 to edge out Ivanchuk by a half-point. In 2009, the championship returned to Moscow, where the format was once again switched to a 22-player double round-robin with revised time controls of 3 minutes per player plus a 2-second increment. The event was won by the young Norwegian chess prodigy Magnus Carlsen, who finished three points clear of the field with 31/42 and went 8/8 against the 2nd through 5th-place finishers.

2010 would prove to be the final year of the event – hosted again in Moscow, the tournament was dubbed the VI World Blitz 2010 and held immediately after the Tal Memorial tournament. Despite losing both his final games, Armenian Grandmaster Levon Aronian was able to clinch the title with 24½/38, half a point ahead of Teimour Radjabov.  In November 2010, a nine-round Swiss tournament was scheduled for February 17, 2011, to serve as a qualifying event for the World Blitz Championship 2011; however, after no bids for the event were made the tournament was eventually cancelled.

Editions and medallists

World Rapid & Blitz Chess Championships (since 2012)

On May 31, 2012, FIDE announced the inaugural World Rapid & Blitz Championships, set to take place in Astana, Kazakhstan, from July 1 to 11. The 2012 tournament consisted of a qualifying round, followed by the rapid and blitz events held consecutively over five days. The championship was originally structured as a 16-player round-robin tournament, set to coincide with the first release of FIDE's rapid and blitz ratings in July 2012; invited were the top 9 players in the FIDE ratings list, the defending champion Levon Aronian, the three medalists of the qualification competition, and three wild-card nominees by the organization committee and FIDE. The event has since been changed to a Swiss tournament with a field of over 100 grandmasters. The top three finishers in the standings are awarded gold, silver, and bronze medals respectively; tiebreaks are determined by the average rating of opponents.

The World Rapid & Blitz Chess Championships 2020 was postponed to 2021 because of the COVID-19 pandemic. It was planned to be held in Kazakhstan in December 2021; however, due to new regulations imposed by the Kazakh government, which would have required many participants to quarantine, the event had to be cancelled again on December 8, 2021. FIDE was considering to either hold the event in Kazakhstan in 2022, or to move it to a different host country. On December 10, 2021, Warsaw, Poland was announced as the new host city, with the tournament taking place from December 25–30, 2021.

Editions and medallists
 Open

The World Blitz Chess Championship 2022 is scheduled to take place on December 29–30, 2022.

 Women

Other events

Herceg Novi Blitz Tournament of 1970

On 8 April 1970, following the USSR vs. Rest of the World 'Match of the Century' hosted in Belgrade, Yugoslavia, a blitz tournament was held in Herceg Novi, featuring many of the same participants from the match. The event was a 12-player double round-robin, with no tiebreaks and five minutes per player. Featuring four World Champions, the field was considered the strongest of any blitz tournament in modern history. Heading into the event, two-time World Champion Tigran Petrosian was considered the favorite to win the event, with Mikhail Tal and Viktor Korchnoi also enjoying favorable chances.

It was American grandmaster Bobby Fischer, however, who put up a dominant performance, scoring 19/22 to win the tournament by 4½ points. Fischer scored a staggering 8½/10 against the five Soviet grandmasters in attendance, dropping only one game in the entire tournament and frequently gaining huge time advantages in each game. According to one report, Fischer spent no more than 2.5 minutes on any game. At the end of the tournament, Tal – who had been whitewashed by Fischer – gave his thoughts on the American's performance.

1988 World Blitz Championship

Following the Candidates' matches for the 1988 cycle, a World Blitz Championship was hosted in Saint John, New Brunswick, Canada, on 19 February 1988. The event was a 32-player single-elimination tournament, with pairings determined by best-of-four matches. The field was headlined by long-time rivals Garry Kasparov and Anatoly Karpov, with the former considered the favorite to win the tournament. Notable participants included:

 , 2750
 , 2715
 , 2630
 , 2625
 , 2625
 , 2620
 , 2595
 , 2595
 , 2595
 , 2585
 , 2580
 , 2560
 , 2560
 , 2550
 , 2540
 , 2535
 , 2530
 , 2525
 , 2510
 , 2505
 , 2505
 , 2495
 , 2495
 , 2480

Former world champion Anatoly Karpov fell out of contention for the championship in just the second round, after dropping his first two games against fellow Soviet grandmaster Alexander Chernin. Reigning world champion Garry Kasparov steamed ahead into the quarterfinals but lost momentum after missing an elementary mate in two against Bulgarian grandmaster Kiril Georgiev; a stunned Kasparov was subsequently knocked out of the tournament. In the final, Mikhail Tal clinched the championship with a 3½–½ victory over Armenian grandmaster Rafael Vaganian.

Mikhail Tal, the 51-year-old former World Champion, breezed through the final rounds with 5½/6. Joining him in the finals was Rafael Vaganian, who survived a controversial semifinal against Kiril Georgiev; the Armenian nearly punched his clock after making an illegal move in Game 2, an accusation that was eventually refuted after match officials resorted to a video review and found that Vaganian's hand had stopped just short of touching the clock. The final was a one-sided affair, with Tal repeatedly utilizing exchange sacrifices to find winning combinations; down 3–0 after three games, Vaganian offered his hand in the 4th game to concede the match to Tal. After the match, Tal claimed he took the event "none too seriously"; he chain-smoked throughout the tournament, and his "preparation" for the semifinal match against Chernin reportedly consisted of a double scotch.

2000 World Blitz Chess Cup

The Plus GSM World Blitz Cup was a 367-player Swiss-system tournament held in Warsaw, Poland, on 9 January 2000. Hosted at the Warsaw Polonia Chess Club, the event consisted of 11 rounds, with each match comprising two 5-minute games for a total of 22 games per player. Indian grandmaster Vishwanathan Anand, the tournament's No. 1 seed, triumphed over a strong field that included 70 Grandmasters and nine of the world's top-20 ranked players with a 17½/22 score. Anand's run saw him pick up 14 wins, 7 draws, and only 1 loss, highlighted by a 43-move win with the black pieces against Anatoly Karpov. The tournament's sponsor, Plus GSM, set aside  a $30,500 prize fund for the event as well as Nokia mobile communicators to be given to the top four finishers and the two top Polish players.

See also
World Rapid Chess Championship
 Fast chess

Notes

References

Blitz
 
blitz